Howe is an unincorporated community and census-designated place in Lima Township, LaGrange County, Indiana. As of the 2010 census its population was 807.

History
Howe was settled in 1834. At that time, it was named "Mongoquinong", a name that the Potawatomi people had given to the prairie in northeastern Indiana.  Shortly thereafter it was renamed "Lima" and was, at that time, the county seat. It was later renamed "Howe" after John B. Howe, a local attorney.

The Howe Military School, the town's most famous attraction, was founded in 1884.

Local places on the National Register 
Sites in Howe on the National Register of Historic Places are:
 John Badlam Howe Mansion, also known as the Howe Military School Rectory
 Lima Township School
 St. James Memorial Chapel
 Star Milling and Electric Company Historic District
 Samuel P. Williams House
Kingsbury Hotel

Geography
It is the principal community in Lima Township.

The Pigeon River, a tributary of the St. Joseph River, flows westward along the southern edge of the community.

Demographics

References

Census-designated places in LaGrange County, Indiana
Census-designated places in Indiana
Populated places established in 1834
1834 establishments in Indiana